Pat Griffith (26 April 1926 – 28 January 1980) was an English racing driver, who raced for the works Aston Martin team during the early 1950s, winning the 1953 RAC Tourist Trophy. However, after a bad crash the 1954 12 Hours of Hyères, he retired to concentrate on the family business.

Racing career

In 1951, Griffith was racing a Lester T51, which was an MG Special, when he first came to the fore. During the British Empire Trophy, he was lapping the Douglas circuit so swiftly, Stirling Moss commented that he believed that he wouldn’t have caught Griffith despite his car being in a higher class, when Griffith’s Lester engine seized. This race brought Griffith to the attention of David Brown, and he was signed by the works Aston Martin team for the 1952 season.

1952 saw Griffith make his only start at Le Mans, but fail to finish the race, likewise in the 1952 Mille Miglia. After those races in Europe, Griffith score two victories for the team. The first being a National event at the Welsh circuit, Fairwood. The second came when he shared the winning DB3 with Peter Collins in the Goodwood Nine-Hour race. He continued to race his Lester. In that season’s British Empire Trophy, he again set a cracking pace, but collided with a dog. Both the car and dog survived the incident, with Griffith going on to win.

In 1953 saw Griffiths continue with the Aston Martin team, still as co-driver to Collins. The partnership finished second in the Goodwood Nine-Hour and won the RAC Tourist Trophy. He also drove the Monkey Stable’s Kieft-MG during the season when his job and Aston Martin commitments allowed, with other minor success. 1954 started well, when he and Collins drove the works Aston Martin DB3S to third place in the 1000 km Buenos Aires. Following retirements in the 12 Hours of Sebring and Mille Miglia, Griffiths was planning to retire from the sport at the end of the season, when he suffered a major accident in the 12 Heures de Hyères. Whilst driving Graham Whitehead’s DB3S, he was forced off the road by another driver and was thrown out of the car. After missing that year's Le Mans, he returned to racing at the RAC Tourist Trophy, but afterwards admitted he had become apprehensive about going too fast", and left the sport for good.

Racing record

Career highlights

Complete 24 Hours of Le Mans results

Complete 12 Hours of Sebring results

Complete Mille Miglia results

Complete 12 Hours of Hyères results

References

World Sportscar Championship drivers
English racing drivers
1980 deaths
24 Hours of Le Mans drivers
Mille Miglia drivers
12 Hours of Sebring drivers
People from Weybridge
Sportspeople from Surrey
1926 births